La Recta Final is a 1990 Latin rap album released by Puerto Rican singer and rapper Vico C and by producer DJ Negro. The album is considered to be one of the most influential in the development of Puerto Rican hip-hop and rap music. The title track It was Vico C's first ever songs and the one that started his path to fame.Eventually it sold over 60,000 copies.

Track listing

Side one
 "La Recta Final" 
 "Gusto, Sexo y Consecuencia" 
 "Viernes 13" 
 "El Amor Existe"

Side two
 "La Recta Final" (Instrumental) 
 "Gusto, Sexo y Consecuencia" (Instrumental) 
 "Viernes 13" (Instrumental) 
 "El Amor Existe" (Instrumental)

References

1989 debut albums
Vico C albums